Greatest Hits Volume II is a greatest hits album by Anne Murray issued in 1989. It is a collection of ten singles released between 1981 and 1989. "If I Ever Fall in Love Again", "When I Fall", and "I'd Fall in Love Tonight" were newly recorded for this album.

Track listing
 "Time Don't Run Out on Me" (Carole King, Gerry Goffin)
 "Just Another Woman in Love" (Patti Ryan, Wanda Mallette)
 "Now and Forever (You and Me)" (David Foster, Randy Goodrum, Jim Vallance)
 "I'd Fall in Love Tonight" (Naomi Martin, Mike Reid)
 "If I Ever Fall in Love Again" (duet with Kenny Rogers) (Steve Dorff, Gloria Sklerov)
 "A Little Good News" (Tommy Rocco, Charlie Black, Rory Bourke)
 "When I Fall" (Paul Overstreet, George Andrews)
 "Another Sleepless Night" (Black, Bourke)
 "Blessed Are the Believers" (Black, Bourke, Sandy Pinkard)
 "Nobody Loves Me Like You Do" (duet with Dave Loggins) (James Dunne, Pamela Phillips)

Chart performance

References

1989 greatest hits albums
Anne Murray compilation albums
Capitol Records compilation albums